The National Association of Proprietors of Private Schools (NAPPS) is the highest body of private school owners in Nigeria. It has branches in the thirty-six states and its headquarters is located in Abuja

History 
The association was founded on Thursday 25 November 2005 in Abuja after a series of meetings by the presidents of associations of private schools in the thirty-six states of the federation. The association was created to promote the interaction and communication of proprietors of private schools in Nigeria to increase the quality of the education given to students and pupils.

National president 
The current national President of NAPPS is Chief Yomi Otubela.

Mission 
NAPPS is to provide knowledge, skills, and orientation needed for national development and transformation.

References 

Nigeria-related lists
Education in Nigeria